Broken Heart(s) or Broken Hearted  may refer to:

 Broken heart, when a human being suffers from an emotional or physical loss
 Takotsubo cardiomyopathy, or broken heart syndrome, a condition in which heart muscles are temporarily weakened
 Cheney's algorithm, a method of garbage collection in computer software systems, uses a forwarding pointer sometimes called a "broken heart"
 Broken Heart (1982–1991), Mylon LeFevre's band
 Broken Heart (album), by The Babys, and the title song, 1977

Songs 
 "Broken Heart" (Escape the Fate song)
 "Broken Heart" (Motion City Soundtrack song)
 "Broken Heart" (Red Flag song)
 "Broken Heart" (White Lion song)
 "Brokenhearted" (Brandy song)
 "Brokenhearted" (Karmin song)
 "Broken Heart", by Axel Rudi Pell from Wild Obsession
 "Broken Heart", by Charlotte Perrelli from Gone Too Long'''
 "Broken Heart", by Eddie Vedder from Ukulele Songs "Broken Hearts", by Living Colour from Vivid "Broken Heart", by Spiritualized from Ladies and Gentlemen We Are Floating in Space Theater, film and television 
 The Broken Heart, a 1633 tragedy play by John Ford
 Broken Hearts'', an 1875 play by W. S. Gilbert
 Broken Heart (film), a 1994 UK short film starring Rachel Shelley
 "Broken Heart" (Once Upon a Time), a television episode

See also 
 Heartbreaking: The Worst Person You Know Just Made A Great Point
 This Broken Heart (disambiguation)
 Edge of a Broken Heart (disambiguation)
 Brokenhearted (disambiguation)
 Crèvecœur (disambiguation)
 Heartbreak (disambiguation)